Pseudotomentella is a genus of corticioid fungi in the family Thelephoraceae. The genus was described by Czech mycologist Mirko Svrček in 1958.

Species
 P. armata
 P. atrofusca
 P. flavovirens
 P. griseopergamacea
 P. humicola
 P. larsenii
 P. longisterigmata
 P. molybdea
 P. mucidula
 P. nigra
 P. ochracea
 P. rhizopunctata
 P. tenebrosa
 P. tristis
 P. vepallidospora
 P. verrucispora
 P. viridiflava

References

External links

Thelephorales
Thelephorales genera